Dalavayi also spelled Dalwai, Dalavay and Dalvoy was meaning title of Chief in Commander or Commander in the military in South Indian dynasty. In Kingdom of Mysore, Hyder Ali and his eldest son Tipu Sultan were appointed to this position.

The word Dalavayi is a Prakrit or vernacular form of the Sanskrit word  (which literally means: leader or chief of the team or wing). In western India, especially Maharashtra and Goa the descendants of Dalavayis still use the title Dalvi (Devanagari: दळवी) as surname, which is modern form of the Prakrit word Dalavayi.

References

Heads of government
Titles in India
People of the Kingdom of Mysore
Military personnel from Karnataka